The 10,5 cm Haubits m/40 is a Swedish 105 mm howitzer, which was manufactured by Bofors during World War II.

The howitzer was license manufactured both in Finland and in Switzerland. Today, the gun is mainly used as a training gun by the Estonian army.

Operators
 105 H 61-37 version. Ca. 40 units from Finland. Used as training guns.
 105 H 61-37 version. 140 units, now withdrawn from service, ca. 40 were given to Estonia.
 Used in Dutch East Indies
 10,5 cm Haubits m/40, about 400 units in five versions or alterations.
 10.5 cm Hb Model 46 version

Versions

10,5 cm Haubits m/40 Original Swedish version
105 H 37 Finnish version manufactured by Tampella
105 H 61-37 Finnish modernized version from the 1960s. Longer L/26 barrel with redesigned muzzle brake, new equilibrators and fixed ammunition for improved rate of fire.
10.5 cm Hb Model 46 Swiss version manufactured in Thun

Specification 
Era: World War II
Name: 105 mm Haubits m/40
Type: Howitzer
Nation: Sweden
Manufacturer: Bofors
Target: General
Date: 1937
Production Date: 1940 -
Service Date: 1940-1990's
Numbers Built
Operators: Siam (today Thailand), Netherlands East Indies (today's Indonesia) and in Finland built under license from Bofors as the m/37, Switzerland built under license from Bofors as 10,5 cm Hb Model 46
Breech Mechanism: Horizontal sliding-wedge breech or interrupted screw breech
Barrel: 22 or 24 (Bore 20,2 cal)
Elevation: -5 to +45°
Traverse: 50°
Caliber:105×155 mm
Carriage: Split trail with spades
Weight: 1970 kg
Length: 5310 mm
Shell Types:
Action: Case-type separate loading, 6 charges
Muzzle velocity: max 449 m/s
Tactical range: 10,5 km
Maximum range: 10,9 km
Rate of Fire:
Crew:7 + 3 reserve
Transportation: Horse drawn, after 1950 motor traction
Miscellaneous: Perforated muzzle brake

Ammunition

Variants
File:AM.089844 (02).jpg|thumb|AM.089844 (02)|Updated version used in swedish artillery until decommissioned in the 1990s

External links

Jaeger Platoon: Finnish Army 1918 - 1945: 105 H/37
www.sodur.com: Haubits H61-37

105 mm artillery
Artillery of Sweden
Artillery of Switzerland
World War II field artillery